Teresa Mary Palmer (born 26 February 1986) is an Australian actress. She began her career with roles in Bedtime Stories (2008), The Sorcerer's Apprentice (2010), Take Me Home Tonight (2011), and I Am Number Four (2011). She received further recognition for starring in the films Warm Bodies (2013), Lights Out (2016), Hacksaw Ridge (2016), and Berlin Syndrome (2017). She also starred in, co-wrote, and co-produced the drama film The Ever After (2014), with her husband Mark Webber. From 2018 to 2022, Palmer starred as Diana Bishop in the supernatural drama series A Discovery of Witches.

Early life
Palmer was born and raised in Adelaide, South Australia, the only child of Kevin Palmer, an investor, and Paula Sanders, a former nurse and missionary.

Her parents separated when she was three, and divorced in 1992 when she was six. She has a stepmother, Kaaren Palmer, as well as two half-sisters and two stepbrothers, who lived with her father. Palmer stated to Interview that she "came from rather humble beginnings"; she lived in public housing with her mother, while regularly visiting her father at his farm near Mylor in the Adelaide Hills (which she later purchased as an adult). Palmer was named after Mother Teresa by her mother, and has stated that she had a "tough upbringing" due to her mother's manic depression.

Palmer was a student at Mercedes College, a private Catholic day school, and won a local-casting audition, "Search for a Movie Star", in 2003. Her first acting job was dressing up as a Strawberry Shortcake doll and as an elf assistant to mall Santa Clauses on weekends for promotions in shopping centres near Adelaide. Palmer went to acting classes for a couple of years and appeared in several television commercials. She was a fast-food attendant at Hungry Jack's in Rundle Mall in 2005, before working at clothing retailers Supré, Mambo Australia and Cotton On.

After graduating from high school, Palmer thought that she would work in an animal rescue service, and eventually open her own animal welfare agency. She was accepted into a university to study teaching and was taking a course on journalism, but had always dreamt of acting. She got a call from an agent about appearing in a student film, 2:37. The director had seen her head shot on the acting agency's website and wanted her to be in the movie. Palmer dropped out of the university to work on the film.

Career

2005: Beginnings in Australia
Palmer had been an extra on Deck Dogz (2005), and other films shot in Adelaide. At the age of 18, she was cast by filmmaker Murali K. Thalluri in the independent Australian film 2:37, about a tragic highschool suicide. She was nominated for the 2006 Australian Film Institute Award for Best Lead Actress for her performance. She then signed with a talent agent in Sydney. A role in Wolf Creek (2005) followed, in a pool party scene.

Palmer starred in the psychological thriller Restraint, with English actor Stephen Moyer and Calvin Klein model Travis Fimmel. Shot on location around New South Wales in mid-2005, the film was written by Dave Warner and directed by David Denneen. Palmer was named an Australian "star of tomorrow" by Screen International that year. She then starred in December Boys, a coming-of-age film set in the 1960s, based on a novel by Michael Noonan. She played Lucy, who has a romance with Daniel Radcliffe's character in a remote beach town. Palmer studied Dominique Swain's performance in Lolita (1997) to capture her character's overt sexuality. The film began shooting in November 2005 on the south coast of Australia. It was released on 14 September 2007 in the UK and US and 20 September 2007 in Australia and received mixed reviews. and failed at the box office.

2:37 premiered at the 2006 Cannes Film Festival in Un Certain Regard selection. The film received a standing ovation, a turning point for Palmer, giving her confidence in acting as a career. The trip to Cannes led her to meet her manager, David Seltzer, and American talent agents. She signed with the William Morris Agency.

2006–2012: Move to Hollywood
Palmer was cast to star with Tom Sturridge in her first American feature, Jumper, a science fiction film directed by Doug Liman. Her part was later recast when the lead characters were rewritten for older actors; her role went to Rachel Bilson. Palmer was devastated from losing the role and returned to Adelaide for a few months. She made her Hollywood feature film debut in The Grudge 2 in 2006, a horror sequel starring Amber Tamblyn and Sarah Michelle Gellar. Palmer described her character, Vanessa, as "the bitchy schoolgirl". The Grudge 2 was released in North America on 13 October 2006 (Friday the 13th) to negative reviews and grossed $70 million worldwide against its $20 million budget.

In early 2007, Palmer was cast as Tori Frederking in the comedy Take Me Home Tonight, starring Anna Faris, Dan Fogler and Topher Grace. Set in the 1980s, the film was directed by Michael Dowse and released in March 2011. Take Me Home Tonight was a box office flop, failing to recoup its $19 million budget.
Palmer starred in the film clip for the 2007 single "Breaking Up", by the band Eskimo Joe, shot in Newcastle. Palmer jumps into the sea with the band's singer, Kavyen Temperley.

Palmer relocated from Semaphore Beach in Adelaide to Los Angeles in May 2007 to further her career, and began auditioning for films. She stated that Los Angeles was "a big adjustment" and "very different" from her home in Australia. She went through a period of loneliness and depression, and considered going back home until she made friends there.

In November 2007, Palmer was cast as the villain, Talia al Ghul, in the DC Comics superhero film, Justice League of America, alongside D.J. Cotrona, Adam Brody, Anton Yelchin, Common and Megan Gale. George Miller was set to direct the film, but it was cancelled by Warner Bros. due to script rewrite issues and the 2007–2008 Writers Guild of America strike.

Palmer was the face of Sydney jeweller Jan Logan's "modern darling" collection in 2008. She was picked that year by Adam Sandler from an audition tape to play his love interest in the Walt Disney Pictures children's film, Bedtime Stories. She played an heiress, Violet Nottingham, starring alongside Guy Pearce and Courteney Cox. Sandler also put Palmer's mother and best friend in scenes in the film. It was released on 25 December 2008 and received to negative reviews but grossed $212 million worldwide on its $80 million budget.

Palmer won the romantic lead in Disney's The Sorcerer's Apprentice, produced by Jerry Bruckheimer and directed by Jon Turteltaub. The film was based on the relevant section of the animated film Fantasia (1940), which was set to a short symphonic poem for orchestra by Paul Dukas, L'apprenti sorcier (The Sorcerer's Apprentice, published in 1897, and by far, the best known of Dukas' compositions), all of which were inspired by the eponymous poem by Johann Wolfgang von Goethe. Palmer stayed in Manhattan's West Village while filming for six months. She played Becky Barnes, a college student who is pursued by Dave Stutler (Jay Baruchel), a physics student and apprentice to the wizard Balthazar (Nicolas Cage). It was released on 14 July 2010 to mixed reviews, and grossed $215 million worldwide on its big $150 million budget. In July 2010, Parade Magazine named the film No. 1 on its list of "Biggest Box Office Flops of 2010 (So Far)".

In 2009, Palmer formed the film production company Avakea Productions, with Australian actresses Tahyna Tozzi and Nathalie Kelley. She was a guest judge on MTV Australia, for the Sydney filmmaking talent contest, Optus one80project. She also filmed an ad campaign that year for the Australian jean store, Just Jeans, and became the face and spokesperson for the Jurlique cosmetics company.

In 2011, Palmer starred in the sci-fi adventure film, I Am Number Four, alongside Alex Pettyfer and Dianna Agron. She played Number Six, one of nine aliens hiding out on Earth because her home planet was destroyed. Her character was skilled in martial arts, rode a Ducati motorcycle, and could "phase" her way through solid objects. She went through stunt training for the role, learning to perform flips, sword fight, and do wirework. The film was adapted from a novel that was the first of a six-part series. Palmer signed on to do three movies, if the film became a franchise. The film was released in theaters on 18 February 2011, and was also released in the IMAX format. It received generally negative reviews from critics and grossed $149 million worldwide.

Palmer was going to star in Fury Road, a sequel to the Mad Max series by Australian filmmaker George Miller, but didn't join the cast due to scheduling conflicts. The film was later postponed. Palmer starred in the short film Bear, directed by Nash Edgerton, which competed at the 2011 Cannes Film Festival.

She appeared opposite Joel Edgerton in the independent Australian drama-thriller, Wish You Were Here, directed by Kieran Darcy-Smith. The film began shooting in Sydney in November 2010, and premiered at the 2012 Sundance Film Festival. The film received positive reviews from critics.

She also starred in a comedic short, Quirky Girl, for the website Funny or Die, opposite Aaron Paul.

2013–present: Further recognition 
Palmer starred in the 2013 zombie film, Warm Bodies, produced by Summit Entertainment, and based on a young adult novel by Isaac Marion. She played Julie, a human who falls in love with a zombie (Nicholas Hoult). It was released on 1 February 2013 in the United States and on 8 February 2013 in the United Kingdom. It opened to positive reviews and grossed $116 million worldwide.

In February 2013, Palmer was announced as the "global face" of Artistry cosmetics. Palmer then starred in Love and Honor with Liam Hemsworth, an independent romance filmed in mid-2011 in Ann Arbor, Michigan. The film is set in the 1960s during the Vietnam War, and was released in March 2013. It had a limited release on 22 March 2013, receiving negative reviews and only grossed $19 thousand.

In 2014, she co-starred alongside Josh Hartnett, Rosario Dawson and Penn Badgley in the romantic drama Parts per Billion. It was released on video on demand on 20 May 2014, and on home video on 6 June 2014. It received negative reviews from critics. Palmer had two films that premiered at the 2014 Toronto International Film Festival, Cut Bank (2014) and Kill Me Three Times (2015), both of which rceeived negative reviews from critics. She played the love interest to Liam Hemsworth and Billy Bob Thornton's daughter in Cut Bank and an assassin in Kill Me Three Times opposite Simon Pegg, Alice Braga and Luke Hemsworth. The latter film was released on 10 April 2015. She starred with Melissa Leo and Phoebe Tonkin in The Ever After, directed by her husband Mark Webber. Written by Palmer and Webber, it is a love story that explores the depths of marriage.

In 2015, she appeared in the Terrence Malick-directed film Knight of Cups, starring Christian Bale. The film premiered in the main competition section at the 65th Berlin International Film Festival in February 2015. Knight of Cups has received mixed reviews from critics. The film was released on 4 March 2016 in the United States by Broad Green Pictures. Palmer had a supporting role in the 2015 remake of Point Break. The film was released in the U.S. on 25 December 2015 and was panned by critics.

In October 2015, it was learned that Palmer would participate in a short film called Too Legit with Zoe Kravitz, Clark Gregg, Nate Corddry and Lauren Weedman. This project was confirmed by the director of the film, Frankie Shaw via Twitter and Instagram and had its premiere on 23 January 2016 at the Sundance Film Festival.

In 2016, she played the female lead role in the adaptation of the Nicholas Sparks novel The Choice, alongside Benjamin Walker, Tom Welling, Alexandra Daddario, and Tom Wilkinson. The film premiered on 5 February 2016 and was panned by critics. She appeared alongside Casey Affleck in the crime–drama heist film, Triple 9 (2016), directed by John Hillcoat. It was released nationwide on 26 February 2016. It was met with mixed reviews and failed to impress at the box office. Also that year, she portrayed Rebecca in the horror film Lights Out, and co-starred in the war drama Hacksaw Ridge, playing the love interest of Andrew Garfield's character; both films received positive reviews, with Palmer's performances being praised. She co-starred in the film Message from the King, alongside Chadwick Boseman, Luke Evans and Alfred Molina.

In 2017, Palmer starred in the psychological thriller Berlin Syndrome, alongside Max Riemelt. She also starred alongside Michiel Huisman and Sam Reid in the science fiction thriller 2:22.

In 2018, Palmer began a starring role as Diana Bishop in the British supernatural drama series A Discovery of Witches. The series received positive reviews.

In 2019, Palmer starred in the biographical sports film Ride Like a Girl, portraying Michelle Payne. The film was directed by Palmer's Hacksaw Ridge co-star Rachel Griffiths, in her feature film directorial debut.

Personal life
Palmer, along with Australian television presenter David Koch, was one of the two number-one ticket holders of the Port Adelaide Football Club starting from 2009, having attended Port Adelaide games since childhood.

Palmer began dating actor and director Mark Webber in late 2012 after contacting him via Twitter. They became engaged in August 2013, and married on 21 December 2013 in Mexico. She and Webber have two sons and two daughters together. Palmer is also a stepmother to Webber's son from his previous relationship with actress Frankie Shaw. The family resides in the Beachwood Canyon community of Los Angeles.

In November 2012, Palmer and friend Phoebe Tonkin launched the health and wellness website Your Zen Life. She co-founded a sister site to Your Zen Life called Your Zen Mama, with her friend, actress Sarah Wright.

Filmography

Film

Television

Music videos

Awards and nominations

References

External links

 
 Teresa Palmer's blog: Your Zen Life
 Lovewell – Palmer's nutritional supplements website

1986 births
Living people
21st-century Australian actresses
Actresses from Adelaide
Australian expatriate actresses in the United States
Australian film actresses
Australian television actresses